Olga Fikotová (born 13 November 1932) is a Czechoslovak and later American discus thrower. She is best known for winning gold at the 1956 Melbourne Olympics and for her romance across Cold War barriers with American hammer gold medalist Hal Connolly.

Biography
A natural athlete, she represented Czechoslovakia in basketball and handball  before switching to discus throw in 1954. Two years later, she was still a medical student at the Charles University in Prague when she competed for Czechoslovakia in the 1956 Summer Olympics held in Melbourne, Australia in the Discus. The 24-year-old became Czechoslovakia's only gold medalist at the Olympics when she won the event with a throw of 53.69 m ahead of Soviet pair Irina Beglyakova (52.54 m) and Nina Ponomaryova (52.02 m).

Half a century later, she commented on her rapid progress:

During the games she fell in love with the American athlete Harold Connolly who won the hammer throw.

The romance was well received by the Western media and public but not as popular with the Czechoslovak team minders. Several months later, Connolly visited her home in Prague where they planned to get married. Fikotová was surprisingly given a permit to marry a foreigner, possibly due to the positive involvement of Czechoslovak president Antonín Zápotocký, who met the couple a few days before the wedding.

Their witnesses for the wedding were the legendary Czech couple and Olympic athletics gold medalists Emil Zátopek and Dana Zátopková. They had planned for a tiny mid-week wedding, but news of it somehow got out and it was attended by thousands of people.

The couple moved to the United States after the wedding.

Olga and Harold both appeared on the June 10, 1958 episode the game show To Tell the Truth, in which each one was shown alongside two impostors and a panel attempted to guess who the real one was.

After moving to the U.S., Olga wanted to continue representing Czechoslovakia, but the Czechoslovak Olympic Committee refused to allow her to do so and then spread the word that she had refused to represent Czechoslovakia any more. She was ostracized by several of her former compatriots for years before the truth became known. Thereafter, as Olga Connolly, she took part in every Olympics till 1972 competing for the United States, placing 7th in 1960 and 6th in 1968. She carried the flag for the United States at the 1972 Summer Olympics.

In 1968, Olga published a book about her romance with Harold Connolly, The Rings of Destiny.
Olga and Harold remained married for 17 years before getting divorced in 1975. One of their sons became a national-caliber javelin thrower and decathlete, and one of their daughters played on the U.S. national volleyball team. For the past decade Olga specialized in holistic fitness studies and training. As a Certified Exercise Therapist she instructed wellness program at the University of California at Irvine until 2017 when she relocated to Nevada where presently she coaches fitness/wellness at EoS Fitness Club in Las Vegas.

References

External links 

 
Image of Olga Connolly-Fikotová at the UCLA Elementary School in the Los Angeles Times Photographic Archive (Collection 1429). UCLA Library Special Collections, Charles E. Young Research Library, University of California, Los Angeles.

1932 births
Living people
Athletes from Prague
Czech female discus throwers
American female discus throwers
Czechoslovak female discus throwers
Olympic athletes of Czechoslovakia
Olympic track and field athletes of the United States
Olympic gold medalists for Czechoslovakia
Athletes (track and field) at the 1956 Summer Olympics
Athletes (track and field) at the 1960 Summer Olympics
Athletes (track and field) at the 1964 Summer Olympics
Athletes (track and field) at the 1968 Summer Olympics
Athletes (track and field) at the 1972 Summer Olympics
Czechoslovak emigrants to the United States
Medalists at the 1956 Summer Olympics
Olympic gold medalists in athletics (track and field)
Naturalized citizens of the United States
21st-century American women
Charles University alumni